Veit Wagner (1420 - c. 1517) was a German sculptor active in Strasbourg from 1495 until his death. Some of his work may be seen in the Church of Saint-Georges in Haguenau, the Church of Saint-Pierre-le-Vieux in Strasbourg, and the monumental tomb in Obernai, as well as the Musée des beaux-arts in Mulhouse.

References 

 Oxford Index entry
 Social Networks and Archival Context entry
 Veit Wagner et la sculpture à Strasbourg à la fin du XVe et au début du XVIe siècle, thesis by Verena Spaeth, 2011 (French language)

15th-century German sculptors
German male sculptors
16th-century German sculptors
Medieval German sculptors